Edvard Vilhelm "Eetu" Westerlund (1 February 1901 – 7 December 1982) was a Greco-Roman wrestler from Finland. He competed at the 1924, 1928 and 1936 Olympics and won a gold medal in 1924 and a bronze in 1928. He collected the same pair of medals at the world championships in 1921–22. Domestically Westerlund competed both in Greco-Roman and freestyle wrestling and won three titles: in 1927 in Greco-Roman lightweight, in 1929 in freestyle lightweight and in 1936 in Greco-Roman light-heavyweight. His brothers Kalle and Emil were also Olympic wrestlers.

References

1901 births
1982 deaths
Olympic wrestlers of Finland
Wrestlers at the 1924 Summer Olympics
Wrestlers at the 1928 Summer Olympics
Wrestlers at the 1936 Summer Olympics
Finnish male sport wrestlers
Olympic gold medalists for Finland
Olympic bronze medalists for Finland
Olympic medalists in wrestling
Medalists at the 1924 Summer Olympics
Medalists at the 1928 Summer Olympics
Sportspeople from Helsinki
World Wrestling Championships medalists
European Wrestling Championships medalists
20th-century Finnish people